The Dr. C.C. and Mabel L. Criss Library is a library on the campus of the University of Nebraska Omaha (UNO). The library serves as the primary source of academic research information for the UNO community through its collections, services, innovative use of emerging technologies, exhibit and event programming, study spaces and other physical and virtual spaces/facilities.

History

In 1916 a  formal library was established on the UNO campus when construction of Joslyn Hall was completed on the original Omaha University campus, located at North 24th and Pratt Streets in North Omaha. By 1928, the UNO Library collection had grown to over 5,000 volumes which precipitated moving the collection to a temporary location around 1930. The university moved from its North Omaha location in 1938, and the library was relocated into the new Administration Building (which later became Arts and Sciences Hall) on the new campus.

In 1976, UNO built a Brutalist structure to house the library renamed in honor of Mutual of Omaha's founder, Dr. C.C. Criss and his wife, Mabel.  Thirty years later an expansion of the original building was undertaken by the UNO campus.  The Dr. Guinter Kahn Addition, completed in 2006, extended the north facade of the library building and added study areas and the Criss Library Cafe.  The total renovation of the original 1976 Library building during 2008–2009, provided more flexible gathering and research spaces for the university community.  Several group and individual study rooms were added throughout the building, the Marion E. and Barbara B. Tritsch Garden was created on the lower level and the H. Don and Connie J. Osborne Family Gallery was established on the main level, which hosts special gallery events and exhibits.

Collections
The library's general collection includes over 700,000 books, over 71,000 journal titles, as well as a substantial number of U.S. government documents and Nebraska State documents.  The library houses a number of special collections including University of Nebraska Omaha Archives (including UNO student newspapers The Gateway and The YELLow Sheet), the papers of Senator Chuck Hagel, the Arthur Paul Afghanistan Collection, and several other unique collections.

The Arthur Paul Afghanistan Collection is the largest collection of Afghan materials in the United States, and one of the largest collections of Afghan research materials in the world. The collection contains over 20,000 titles, including a number of rare documents, such as the illuminated/decorated manuscript of "Haft Aurang", and poems by Jami (1414–1492). In addition to onsite assistance, parts of the collection have been digitized and are available online. The collection is especially strong in 19th and early 20th century English language books by British authors conveying their personal experiences and the British Indian government's policy concerning Afghanistan. English, Dari, and Pashto are the primary languages of the collection with materials in twenty-four different languages. Most items are cataloged and may be searched and identified through the library's catalog.

Art in Criss Library

The UNO Criss Library houses several original works of art by local and internationally known artists.

Recent acquisitions to the collection include a mobile by Mel Ritsau installed below the central skylight in Criss Library at the end of the building renovation in 2009, and  an untitled monumental head sculpture by Jun Kaneko added to the Kahn addition of the library in 2006.

Other libraries

The Kaneko-UNO Library at 12th and Jones streets in downtown Omaha offers research scientists, business leaders, teachers, visual artists, and students access to resources and materials they might not find in their day-to-day environment.  The library seeks to inspire people to expand their awareness and knowledge in an atmosphere of flexible learning.

See also
Shaista Wahab

References

External links
Dr. C.C. and Mabel L. Criss Library website
Dr. C.C. and Mabel L. Criss Library Mobile website
Kaneko-UNO library website

University and college academic libraries in the United States
Libraries in Omaha, Nebraska
Federal depository libraries
University of Nebraska Omaha
Library buildings completed in 1976